Celorico de Basto  is a municipality in Braga District in Portugal. The population in 2011 was 20,098, in an area of 181.07 km². The town of Celorico de Basto has around 2500 inhabitants. The municipality is located bordering the municipality of Cabeceiras de Basto to the north, Mondim de Basto to the east, Amarante to the south, Felgueiras to the southeast and Fafe to the west.

The present mayor is Joaquim Mota Silva, elected by the Social Democratic Party. The municipal holiday is July 25.

Celorico de Basto has been occupied since ancient times, as witness marks in the most ancient civilisations have left here.

Parishes

Administratively, the municipality is divided into 15 civil parishes (freguesias):

 Agilde
 Arnóia
 Borba de Montanha
 Britelo, Gémeos e Ourilhe
 Caçarilhe e Infesta
 Canedo de e Corgo
 Carvalho e Basto (Santa Tecla)
 Codeçoso
 Fervença
 Moreira do Castelo
 Rego
 Ribas
 São Clemente de Basto
 Vale de Bouro
 Veade, Gagos e Molares

Tourism
The municipality of Celorico de Basto has a vast historical and architectural, civil, and religious heritage and a great diversity of places of tourist interest to visit. From its diversification of tradition, the Castle of Arnoia, the Monastery of Arnoia, as well as the Romanesque churches of Veade, Fervença, and Ribas are highlighted.

Stand out from among the various monuments and places to visit:
Arnoia Castle, the only Castle on the Romanesque Route, located in the village of Basto;
Monastery of São Bento de Arnoia, Benedictine monastery;
Natural Trail of Tâmega; 
Church of the Savior of Fervença, part of the Route of the Romanesque;
Church of Salvador de Ribas, part of the Route of the Romanesque;
Church of Santa Maria de Veade, part of the Route of the Romanesque;
Estela of Vila Boa;
Municipal Library of Celorico de Basto Prof. Marcelo Rebelo de Sousa;
Freixieiro Ludic Park;
 Quinta do Prado, with its house and gardens.

Festivities
Festa Internacional das Camélias

Gastronomy
In the municipality of Celorico de Basto, stands out the Pão de ló and the cavacas.
The special condiment is Green wine, of demarcated quality and very particular flavour and aroma.

International relations

Celorico de Basto is twinned with:
 Houilles, France since 1973
  Wiltz, Luxemburgo
  Catanduva, Brasil

Notable people 
 Rodrigo José Rodrigues (1879-1963) a military physician, colonial administrator and politician 
 António Ribeiro (1928–1998) a Portuguese Cardinal of the Roman Catholic Church, who was Patriarch of Lisbon from 1971 to 1998

References

External links
Municipality official website

Towns in Portugal
Municipalities of Braga District